Lisa Larsen Rainsberger, previously known as Lisa Larsen Weidenbach, (born May 7, 1961) is a distance runner. She is a member of the University of Michigan Track and Field and Road Runners of America Halls of Fame. Her marathon times were among the top ten in the US in 1984 and 1987–1994. As of 2008, she was listed four times in the top 100 all-time US women's marathon performances, with a best time of 2:28:15.

Early life 

While in high school in Battle Creek, Michigan, Rainsberger won competitions as a swimmer in the Individual Medley, qualifying for the 1980 Olympic Swimming trials, and later competed on scholarship as an All-American swimmer in college at the University of Michigan. She walked away from that scholarship to earn another as a collegiate runner and was a two-time All-American in track and cross country.

Professional career 

In 1984, she ran the inaugural women’s Olympic marathon trials where she finished fourth, missing a spot in the Olympic games. In 1985, she won the Boston Marathon in a time of 2:34:06. An American did not win the Boston Marathon again until 2018, 33 years later, when Desiree Linden ran to victory. Rainsberger finished first back-to-back in the Chicago Marathon in 1988 (2:29:17) and 1989 (2:28:15), something no American woman has repeated since. She had run in numerous other distance races on the track and road, in the United States and abroad (notably Japan's Hokkaido Marathon).

Rainsberger ended her 12-year career of professional competition after a final attempt to become a professional triathlete and training for the Olympics. She now focuses on her family and coaching. She coaches members of the Army's world class athlete program, and her daughter, Katie Rainsberger, who is a champion in her own right.

Achievements

1980–84 University of Michigan three sport NCAA All-American (swimming, cross country, track & field); Cross Country Team Captain
1984 Montreal Marathon champion
1985 Boston Marathon champion
1985 USAT&F Runner of the Year
1985 Cherry Blossom Ten Mile Run, champion 53:30
1986–89 Crim 10 Mile champion, 52:32
1988 US Olympic Marathon Team Trials, 4th, Alternate
1988 US Olympic Track & Field Trials 10k, 32:12
1988, 1989 Chicago Marathon champion, 2:29:12 and 2:28:15
1989, 1990 Cherry Blossom 10 Mile champion, 52:30
1989 American Record 15k, 48:28
1989 USAT&F Runner of the Year
1989 Runner's World Runner of the Year
1991 Bloomsday 12k champion
1990 Hokkaido Marathon champion
1990, 1991 Sapporo, Japan Half Marathon champion
1993 Twin Cities Marathon champion
1995, 1996 Kyoto, Japan Half Marathon 2nd place
1996 US Olympic Marathon Trials Qualifier
1997 Lawrence Triathlon - 1st
1997 USA Triathlon Nationals - 5th
1997 Mrs. T's Triathlon Pro - 5th

See also
List of winners of the Boston Marathon
List of winners of the Chicago Marathon

Personal 
Lisa's daughter, Katie Rainsberger, secured the United States' girls' high school 5K cross country record with a time of 16:23.40, set in 2016. It was surpassed in 2018 by Katelyn Tuohy.

References

External links

1961 births
Living people
American female long-distance runners
American female marathon runners
People from Battle Creek, Michigan
Boston Marathon female winners
Chicago Marathon female winners
Michigan Wolverines women's track and field athletes
Michigan Wolverines women's cross country runners